One Nation Underground is the third album released by Ill Niño – and final studio album released through Roadrunner. The album debuted at No. 101 in the Billboard Top 200 with first week sales of nearly 11,000. Its sales of approximately 210,000 are well down on the near Gold selling Confession. The album features several elements and influences of metalcore, groove metal and even tribal music. This is the band's last album with guitarist Jardel Paisante.

Track listing

Notes:
 When the band announced the track list for this album, there was a cover of the Peter Gabriel song "Red Rain" on the album, as track 13. It was cut from the official release, though it was later released on The Undercover Sessions. The instrumental song "Barely Breathing" was added to the official release instead.
 The tracks "All I Ask For" and "Everything Beautiful" are both being played in the game Ghost Recon Advanced Warfighter for the Xbox 360.
 The track "What You Deserve" plays in Arena Football.

Personnel 
Cristian Machado: vocals, add. guitar
Jardel Martins Paisante: guitar
Ahrue Luster: guitar
Lazaro Pina: bass
Dave Chavarri: drums, add. percussion
Daniel Couto: percussion
Omar Clavijo: keyboards, programming
Eddie Wohl: add. keyboards
Jamey Jasta: vocals on "Turns to Gray"

References

2005 albums
Ill Niño albums
Roadrunner Records albums
Albums produced by Eddie Wohl